The official 2015/2016 snooker world ranking points for the professional snooker players on the World Snooker Main Tour in the 2015–16 season are based on performances in ranking and minor-ranking in tournaments over a two-year rolling period. The rankings at the start of 2015/2016 season are determined by prize money earned in the 2013/2014 and 2014/2015 seasons and are updated after every tournament carrying ranking status. As points are accrued from tournaments throughout the current season, the points from the corresponding tournaments from two seasons earlier are dropped. If a player loses their first match in a tournament, then for the 2013/2014 season only, half the money earned for the event counts towards the player's ranking, and from the 2014/2015 season a player will not receive any points at all for that tournament.

The rankings set the official seedings at the start of the season and at seven further stages. The total points accumulated by the cut-off dates for the revised seedings are based on all the points up to that date in the 2015/2016 season, all of the points from the 2014/2015 season, and the points from the 2013/2014 season that have not yet been dropped.

Seeding revisions

Ranking points

Notes

References 

2015
Ranking points 2015
Ranking points 2016